The Royal Academy of Jurisprudence and Legislation (Spanish: Real Academia de Jurisprudencia y Legislación) is a legal institution based in Madrid. It has a unique position as an independent and privately funded institution led by eminent international jurists mainly in the Hispanic area; its purpose is to promote the knowledge, investigation and debate in the legal area. It is placed in a building declared Cultural Interest Good in 1998.

References 

Buildings and structures in Madrid
Bien de Interés Cultural landmarks in Madrid
J